The white-cheeked bullfinch (Pyrrhula leucogenis) is a species of finch in the family Fringillidae.

It is found in mountain regions of the Philippines, mainly on the two largest Philippine islands, Luzon and Mindanao.  It has also been reported on the island of Panay.  Its natural habitat is subtropical or tropical moist montane forests.  The bird's conservation status is 'least concern', although it is uncommon and has a very restricted range.

Taxonomy
The taxonomy was described in 2001 by Arnaiz-Villena et al. All birds belonging to the genus Pyrrhula have a common ancestor: Pinicola enucleator.

References

1. Cornell Lab of Ornithology Birds of the World.
2. Robert S. Kennedy et al., "A Guide to the Birds of the Philippines", Oxford University Press, 2013.

white-cheeked bullfinch
Endemic birds of the Philippines
white-cheeked bullfinch
Taxa named by William Robert Ogilvie-Grant
Taxonomy articles created by Polbot